Norman Roberts (born July 21, 1965) is a men's college basketball coach who is an assistant coach at the University of Kansas. He also is the former head coach at St. John's University.

Early life
Roberts attended Springfield Gardens High School, where he was a teammate of Anthony Mason.

Coaching career
Roberts's first coaching opportunity came when Jack Curran hired him as coach of the freshman team at Archbishop Molloy High School. In 1991 Roberts became head coach at Queens College, a position he held until 1995. Prior to the 1996–97 season, Roberts was hired by then-Oral Roberts head coach Bill Self. Roberts followed Self to the University of Tulsa (in 1998), University of Illinois (in 2000) and University of Kansas (in 2003). On April 13, 2004 he signed a five-year contract to coach the men's basketball team at St. John's University. His assistants included Glenn Braica, Chris Casey, and Fred Quartlebaum. In April 2012 Roberts returned to the University of Kansas as an assistant coach, filling the position left by Danny Manning.

St. John's
On April 13, 2004 Roberts signed a five-year contract to coach the men's basketball team at St. John's University. Although Roberts was thought of as a longshot, school officials were impressed by his work as Self's top recruiter over the past four years.  Additionally, he was a New York City native, and it was hoped he would rebuild the Red Storm's traditional pipeline to the area's rich pool of high school basketball players.  Historically, St. John's has been known for fielding powerhouse teams built mainly on New York City talent.  He succeeded Kevin Clark, who served as the interim coach after Mike Jarvis, who was fired midway through the 2003–04 season.

Roberts was fired by St. John's on March 19, 2010, after the Red Storm lost in the first round of the 2010 NIT.  In 2011, Florida coach Billy Donovan hired Roberts as an assistant coach.

Florida
Roberts served as an assistant coach for Florida for one season.

Kansas
Roberts was hired by Kansas in 2012 as an assistant. He won his first National Championship in the 2021–22 season. The following season, while head coach Bill Self served a 4-game suspension for recruiting violations, he served as acting head coach. He went 4–0 in the games he was acting head coach. Later that season, after Self was hospitalized (8 March 2023), Roberts also would coach the Jayhawks in the 2023 Big 12 Tournament and the NCAA Tournament due to Self's health issues.

Family
Roberts and his wife have two sons. Both of his sons played Division I basketball; Niko played at Kansas as an invited walk-on and Justin played at Niagara.

Head coaching record

References

External links
 Kansas Jayhawks bio
 St. John's Red Storm bio

1965 births
Living people
African-American basketball coaches
American men's basketball players
Basketball coaches from New York (state)
Basketball players from New York City
College men's basketball head coaches in the United States
Florida Gators men's basketball coaches
High school basketball coaches in the United States
Illinois Fighting Illini men's basketball coaches
Kansas Jayhawks men's basketball coaches
Oral Roberts Golden Eagles men's basketball coaches
Queens Knights men's basketball coaches
Queens Knights men's basketball players
Sportspeople from Queens, New York
St. John's Red Storm men's basketball coaches
Tulsa Golden Hurricane men's basketball coaches
21st-century African-American people
20th-century African-American sportspeople